La Mer may refer to:

La mer (Debussy), an orchestral composition by Claude Debussy
"La Mer" (song), a 1946 song by Charles Trenet
La Mer (horse), a champion racehorse
La Mer (film), an 1895 film directed by Louis Lumière
La Mer, a brand of cosmetics owned by the Estée Lauder Companies
"La Mer", a song on The Fragile (Nine Inch Nails album)